As of December 2021, the International Union for Conservation of Nature (IUCN) lists 673 critically endangered amphibian species, including 146 which are tagged as possibly extinct. 9.2% of all evaluated amphibian species are listed as critically endangered. 
No subpopulations of amphibians have been evaluated by the IUCN.

Additionally, 1193 amphibian species (16.4% of those evaluated) are listed as data deficient, meaning there is insufficient information for a full assessment of conservation status. As these species typically have small distributions and/or populations, they are intrinsically likely to be threatened, according to the IUCN. While the category of data deficient indicates that no assessment of extinction risk has been made for the taxa, the IUCN notes that it may be appropriate to give them "the same degree of attention as threatened taxa, at least until their status can be assessed."

This is a complete list of critically endangered amphibian species evaluated by the IUCN. Species considered possibly extinct by the IUCN are marked as such.

Salamanders
There are 121 salamander species assessed as critically endangered.

Giant salamanders
Chinese giant salamander (Andrias davidianus)

Lungless salamanders

Asiatic salamanders

Mole salamanders

Salamandrids

Frogs
There are 549 frog species assessed as critically endangered.

Water frogs

Robber frogs

Shrub frogs

Cryptic forest frogs

Rain frogs

True toads

Fleshbelly frogs

Glass frogs

Litter frogs

Screeching frogs

Poison dart frogs

Mantellids

Narrow-mouthed frogs

True frogs

Australian water frogs

Hylids

African reed frogs

Other frog species

Gynmophiona

There are 3 caecilian species assessed as critically endangered.

See also 
 Lists of IUCN Red List critically endangered species
 List of least concern amphibians
 List of near threatened amphibians
 List of vulnerable amphibians
 List of endangered amphibians
 List of recently extinct amphibians
 List of data deficient amphibians

References 

Amphibians

Critically endangered amphibians
Critically endangered amphibians